I, I (stylized as i,i) is the fourth studio album by American indie folk band Bon Iver. It was released track by track per hour on August 8, 2019; the intro only being available on the Bon Iver fan subreddit until August 9, when the album was released properly on all services, with a physical release to follow on August 30. The album was preceded by the singles "Hey, Ma" and "U (Man Like)", and the tracks "Faith" and "Jelmore" were released alongside the album pre-order. I, I features contributions from James Blake, Aaron Dessner, Bruce Hornsby, Moses Sumney, and Channy Leaneagh, among others. The album was nominated for Best Recording Package, Album of the Year and Best Alternative Music Album at the 62nd Annual Grammy Awards, as well as Record of the Year for the song "Hey, Ma".

Background
The project was first teased during an Instagram Live broadcast by Justin Vernon's personal account, in which he revealed a snippet of the song previously known as "We Maddie Parry" (later shortened to "We") and showed a song list with working titles. After the band's show at All Points East 2019, they premiered two new songs; U (Man Like) and Hey, Ma, which were released as singles next day, as well as dates for the fall 2019 tour. On July 11, they announced that their fourth album, "i,i" would be released on August 30 (later moved to August 9) and released the third and fourth singles, "Jelmore" and "Faith".
The band likened the album to the season of fall, with I, I completing a cycle that began with the "winter" of For Emma, Forever Ago (2007), followed by "the frenetic spring of Bon Iver, Bon Iver (2011), and the unhinged summer of 22, A Million (2016)". Vernon additionally described the album as "very much like the most adult record, the most complete" and "more honest, generous work". The album was recorded over an extended period of time at April Base in Wisconsin, and was completed at Sonic Ranch in Texas.  On July 31, 2019, the band released a documentary short called Bon Iver: Autumn, featuring Vernon and bandmates discussing the new album and aspects of the upcoming Autumn 2019 tour. To promote the album, listening parties took place on August 7 in several countries.

On August 8, without prior announcement, eight of the album's nine remaining songs were released digitally (one each hour) and the ninth, "Yi", was posted on Reddit. This was followed by the band moving the album's digital release date three weeks forward to August 9, with the physical release on August 30.

Music
 
A number of publications have considered its sound to be a merger of the musical elements of Bon Iver's previous three albums, with Chris DeVille of Stereogum considering it the first of their albums "that sounds more familiar than new." Its production includes acoustic guitars, horns, piano, synthesizers, woodwind, organ and interwoven voices along with "jittery electronics," "otherworldly beats, whispering brass and fragmentary structures." Music journalists have noted its electronic and experimental features reminiscent of those found on 22, A Million, but note that it has been used more sparingly than on the aforementioned album, with DIY writer opining that it "[provides] the foundation for the record’s truly big moments."

Critical reception

I, I received acclaim from critics. At Metacritic, which assigns a normalized rating out of 100 to reviews from mainstream critics, I, I has an average score of 80 based on 33 reviews. Hannah Mylrea of NME gave the album a perfect score, considering it "pieced [...] in an impossibly intelligent way." DIY writer Ben Tipple also gave it full marks, dubbing it "an emotional tour-de-force that displays an unparalleled understanding of the power of music," further praising its "masterful delicacy" and sparing use of electronic experimentation. Pitchfork awarded it the "Best New Music" accolade, with editor Matthew Strauss calling it the band's "most honest and forthright music ever"; he additionally noted Vernon's vocal performance, considering that he "sings with more texture and conviction than ever before." Damien Morris of The Observer hailed it as "complex and majestic," saying that "i,i spins a mesmerising web of superficially insubstantial yet intensely majestic music."

Some critics had their reservations. Chase McMullen of The 405 deemed the album underwhelming, considering it to be inferior to the band's previous work, he noted that they are "doing the things they know well," and that while "at times, this can work in i,i's favor, [...] it can feel a bit limited and complacent." Ben Beaumont-Thomas named it Bon Iver's "first ever misfire" in his assessment for The Guardian, lamenting its "weak melodies and bad poetry." In a mixed review for The Independent, Jazz Monroe described it as an "exquisite album that is otherwise frustratingly apolitical." Writing for No Depression, John Amen concluded, "i,i is, relatively speaking, a fine album. It may even end up being one of 2019’s notable sets. Still, it’s the least magical of Vernon’s tetralogy."

Track listing

Samples
 "Naeem" incorporates elements of "That Storm", performed by Naeem, and "More Love", written by Gary Nicholson and Tim O'Brien, and performed by Tim O'Brien.
 "Sh'Diah" incorporates elements of "Waves" performed by Velvet Negroni.

Personnel
Credits adapted from the band's official website.

Bon Iver
 Sean Carey – drums, piano, voice
 Matt McCaughan – drums, synthesis
 Andrew Fitzpatrick – synthesis, guitar
 Michael Lewis – bass guitar, synthesizers, saxophone
 Justin Vernon – guitar, bass guitar, synthesizers, voice; radio 
Featuring:
 Jenn Wasner – guitar, synthesizers, voice; chorus 
 Rob Moose – violin , viola , octave viola , piano , string arrangements , all "Worm Crew" arrangements 

Worm Crew – horns 
 Rob Moose – conducting
 CJ Camerieri – trumpet, flugelhorn, french horn
 Michael Lewis – tenor and soprano saxophones
 Hideaki Aomori – clarinets, alto saxophone
 Tim Albright – trombone
 Randy Pingrey – trombone
 Ross Garren – harmonicas

Additional musicians
 Trever Hagen – barn , shoes , slides , prepared trumpet f. 
 Wheezy – drum programming , programming 
 James Blake – Prophet 600 , vocals 
 Mike Noyce – vocals 
 Jeremy Nutzman a.k.a. Velvet Negroni – vocals 
 Camilla Staveley-Taylor – vocals , distorted vocals 
 Aaron Dessner – piano , guitar 
 BJ Burton – programming , arrangement , TR 8's 
 Buddy Ross – synthesizer , Messina , piano , Wurlitzer 
 Joe Rainey, Sr. – vocals 
 Michael Migizi Sullivan, Sr. – vocals 
 Phil Cook – piano , B3 , voice 
 Zach Hanson – piano , keyboards , Juno 
 Brad Cook – synthesizer , basses , Folktek Modified Omnichord 
 Chris Messina – synthesizer 
 Ben Lester – CP-70 electric piano 
 Psymun – sampling 
 Brian Moen – drums 
 Jake Luppen – guitar 
 Bruce Hornsby – piano , voice 
 Elsa Jensen – voice 
 Moses Sumney – voice 
 Brooklyn Youth Chorus – chorus 
 Bryce Dessner – chorus , piano 
 Toni Pierce-Sands – claps 
 Christian Warner – voice 
 Graham Tolbert – voice 
 Noah Goldstein – programming 
 Francis Starlite – Buchla 
 Sad Sax of Shit – saxophones 
 Joe Westerlund – shaker 
 JT Bates – drums 
 Jeremy Ylvisaker – electric guitar 

Technical
 Chris Messina – production, engineering, mixing
 Brad Cook – production
 Justin Vernon – production
 Zach Hanson – engineering, mixing
 Marta Salogni – additional engineering
 Jerry Ordonez – assistant engineering, additional mixing
 Zac Hernandez – assistant engineering
 Alli Rogers – assistant engineering
 Rob Moose – string arrangements engineering
 Greg Calbi – mastering
 BJ Burton – production , additional production , additional engineering , mixing 
 Trever Hagen – additional production , additional engineering 
 Andrew Sarlo – additional production , additional engineering 
 Wheezy – additional production 
 TU Dance – additional production 
 Buddy Ross – additional production 
 Ryan Olson – additional production 
 Josh Berg – additional engineering 
 Wayne Pooley – additional engineering 
 Bella Blasko – additional engineering 
 Noah Goldstein – additional engineering 

Artwork and release
 Andra Chumas – executive production
 Eric Timothy Carlson – art, direction
 Aaron Anderson – art, direction
 Graham Tolbert – photography
 TU Dance – dance movement and visuals
Toni Pierce-Sands
Uri Sands
Taylor Collier – dancing
Jacob Lewis – dancing
Alexander Pham – dancing
Randall Riley – dancing
Alexis Staley – dancing
Christian Warner – dancing

Charts

Weekly charts

Year-end charts

References

2019 albums
Albums produced by Justin Vernon
Bon Iver albums
Jagjaguwar albums
Albums recorded at Sonic Ranch